is an independent writer at his own company, Sayonaraoyasumi. He previously worked as a creative director for Square and Brownie Brown. He first became a developer when he took a job with Square as a debugger on the Game Boy game Final Fantasy Legend II. He began working as a scenario designer on the Super Famicom game Live a Live. He was also involved in games in the Mana series, including Legend of Mana.

He left Square to work with Brownie Brown, a partnership between Brownies and Nintendo. He continued making games in the Mana series, starting with a remake of Final Fantasy Adventure titled Sword of Mana for the Game Boy Advance. He went on to direct a new franchise called Magical Vacation for the Game Boy Advance, which was followed by Magical Starsign for the Nintendo DS.  He later directed Mother 3, the long-awaited sequel to EarthBound. His final work at Brownie Brown before the end of the company's partnership with Nintendo was as the lead planner on Fantasy Life for the Nintendo 3DS.

Inoue began Sayonaraoyasumi on April 2, 2012, around the time Brownie Brown's partnership with Nintendo ended in 2012 and it was split into Brownies and 1-Up Studio. Under this alias, he worked as a scenario writer on Triangle Strategy for the Nintendo Switch.

Works

References 

Japanese video game directors
Japanese video game programmers
Living people
Square Enix people
Nintendo people
Year of birth missing (living people)